Nightwalker may refer to:
Sleepwalking
Nightwalking, wandering at night in areas where one has no legitimate business in a way that might alarm people
Nightwalker (album), the 1981 album by Canadian recording artist Gino Vannelli
Nightwalker: The Midnight Detective, an anime television series based on a video game
The night form of the Shishigami (Spirit of the Forest), a character from Princess Mononoke 
A translation of the Japanese Daidarabotchi, a giant from Japanese mythology
A literal translation of many terms (such as Sanskrit tāmisra, niśācara, and kṣaṇada) for the Rākṣasas, a class of Indian demons    
Prostitution